Angers-Saint-Laud is a railway station located in Angers, Maine-et-Loire, western France. The station was opened in 1849 and is located on the Le Mans–Angers railway and the Tours–Saint-Nazaire railway. The train services are operated by SNCF.

The station is at 40 m above sea level and at kilometre post 342.950 of the Tours–Saint-Nazaire railway.

History
The station was constructed beginning in 1848 and ultimately opened on 30 July 1849, along with the Saumur-Angers section of the Tours-Saint-Nazaire railway. In 1851 the line was completed from Angers westward to Nantes. The station gradually expanded as traffic grew in the latter half of the 19th century.

The station building was largely destroyed by bombing raids during the Second World War. A new one was opened in 1956, and ultimately renovated in 2001.

In 2014, the station was used by 5,284,928 travelers.

Train services
The following services currently call at Angers-Saint-Laud:

High speed services (TGV) Nantes - Angers - Le Mans - Paris
High speed services (TGV) Nantes - Angers - Le Mans - Aeroport CDG - Lille
High speed services (TGV) Nantes - Angers - Tours / Le Mans - Lyon - Marseille
High speed services (TGV) Nantes - Angers - Tours / Le Mans - Lyon - Montpellier
High speed services (TGV) Nantes - Angers - Le Mans - Aeroport CDG - Strasbourg
High speed services (TGV) Le Croisic - St Nazaire - Nantes - Angers - Paris
High speed services (TGV) Les Sables-d'Olonne - Nantes - Angers - Paris
Intercity services (Intercités) Nantes - Tours - Bourges - Lyon
Regional service (TER Pays de la Loire) Nantes - Angers - Tours - Orleans
Regional service (TER Pays de la Loire) Nantes - Angers - Le Mans
Local service (TER Pays de la Loire) Nantes - Angers
Local service (TER Pays de la Loire) Angers - Saumur - Tours
Local service (TER Pays de la Loire) Angers - Cholet
OUIGO Services

References

Railway stations in Maine-et-Loire
TER Pays de la Loire
Railway stations in France opened in 1849
Buildings and structures in Angers